The men's C-1 1000 metres event was an open-style, individual canoeing event conducted as part of the Canoeing at the 1988 Summer Olympics program.

Medallists

Results

Heats
Fifteen competitors were entered. Held on September 27, the top three finishers in each heat moved on to the semifinals with the others relegated to the repechages.

Repechages
Held on September 27, the top three finishers in each repechage moved on to the semifinals.

Semifinals
Taking place on September 29, the top three finishers in each semifinal advanced to the final.

Pinczura's disqualification was not disclosed in the official report.

Final
The final took place on October 1.

References
1988 Summer Olympics official report Volume 2, Part 2. pp. 344–5. 
Sports-reference.com 1988 C-1 1000 m results.

Men's C-1 1000
Men's events at the 1988 Summer Olympics